July 22 - Eastern Orthodox Church calendar - July 24

All fixed commemorations below are celebrated on August 5 by Old Calendar.

For July 23rd, Orthodox Churches on the Old Calendar commemorate the Saints listed on July 10.

Saints
 Righteous Hannah (Anna), mother of the Prophet Samuel (1100 BC)  (see also: December 9)
 Prophet Ezekiel (6th century BC)  (see also: July 21)
 Martyr Vitalius, at Ravenna (62)
 Hieromartyr Apollinaris, Bishop of Ravenna (c. 75)
 Hieromartyr Apollonius, at Rome (183)
 Martyrs Trophimus, Theophilus, and 13 others in Lycia (284-305)  (see also: July 21)
 The Holy 7 Martyrs at Carthage (or at Chaldia). 
 Venerable Symeon of Emesa, Fool-for-Christ (590)  (see also: July 21)
 The (250) Holy Martyrs tortured and killed in Bulgaria, during the reign of Nicephorus the Emperor (802-811)
 Venerable Anna of Leucadia (or Susanna) (c. 829-842 or 919)
 Saint Therissos (Thyrsos), Bishop of Karpasia in Cyprus.  (see also: August 5)

Pre-Schism Western saints
 Saints Apollonius and Eugene, early Roman martyrs, the former was pierced with arrows at the stake, the latter was beheaded.
 Saint Rasyphus, a martyr venerated in Rome from early times.
 Saint Liborius of Le Mans, Bishop of Le Mans in France from 348 to 390, he is the patron saint of Paderborn in Germany where his relics were moved in 836 (390)
 Venerable John Cassian the Roman, Abbot of Monastery of St Victor, Marseille (435)  (see also: February 29 - East)
 Saint Valerian, a monk at Lérins in the south of France who became Bishop of Cimiez (c. 460)
 Saints Rasyphus and Ravennus, born in Britain, they became hermits in the north of France and were martyred in Macé (5th century)
 Saints Romula, Redempta and Herundo, three holy virgins who lived as ascetics near the church of St Mary Major in Rome (c. 580)
 Saint Vitalian, Pope of Rome from 657 to 672 (672)

Post-Schism Orthodox saints
 Saint Pelagia of Tinos, nun, of Tinos (1834)
 Saint John Jacob the Chozebite, of Neamț (1960)  (see also: August 5)

New martyrs and confessors
 New Hieromartyr Michael Troitsky, Priest, and Martyr Andrew Argunov (1938)
 New Hieromartyr Nectarius (Trezvinsky), Bishop of Yaransk.

Other commemorations
 Translation of the relics (403-404) of Hieromartyr Phocas, Bishop of Sinope (117)  (see also: July 22)
 Synaxis of the Holy Prophet and Baptist John, in the district of Olympus, by Saint Thomas.
 Commemoration of the Miraculous Appearance of the Mother of God at Pochaev Lavra, which saved the monastery from the assault of the Tatars and Turks (1675)
 Icon of the Most Holy Theotokos "Pochaev" (1675)
 Icon of the Most Holy Theotokos "The Joy of All Who Sorrow" (with coins) of St. Petersburg (1888)
 Translation of the Relics (2000) of St. Herman (Germanus), Archbishop of Kazan (1567) to Sviyazhsk.
 Glorification (2001) of St. Theodore Ushakov, Admiral of the Russian Navy.

Icon gallery

Notes

References

Sources
 July 23/August 5. Orthodox Calendar (PRAVOSLAVIE.RU).
 August 5 / July 23. HOLY TRINITY RUSSIAN ORTHODOX CHURCH (A parish of the Patriarchate of Moscow).
 July 23. OCA - The Lives of the Saints.
 July 23. The Year of Our Salvation - Holy Transfiguration Monastery, Brookline, Massachusetts. 
 The Autonomous Orthodox Metropolia of Western Europe and the Americas (ROCOR). St. Hilarion Calendar of Saints for the year of our Lord 2004. St. Hilarion Press (Austin, TX). p. 54.
 The Twenty-Third Day of the Month of July. Orthodoxy in China.
 July 23. Latin Saints of the Orthodox Patriarchate of Rome.
 The Roman Martyrology. Transl. by the Archbishop of Baltimore. Last Edition, According to the Copy Printed at Rome in 1914. Revised Edition, with the Imprimatur of His Eminence Cardinal Gibbons. Baltimore: John Murphy Company, 1916. pp. 217–218.
 Rev. Richard Stanton. A Menology of England and Wales, or, Brief Memorials of the Ancient British and English Saints Arranged According to the Calendar, Together with the Martyrs of the 16th and 17th Centuries. London: Burns & Oates, 1892. pp. 352–353.

 Greek Sources
 Great Synaxaristes:  23 ΙΟΥΛΙΟΥ. ΜΕΓΑΣ ΣΥΝΑΞΑΡΙΣΤΗΣ.
  Συναξαριστής. 23 Ιουλίου. ECCLESIA.GR. (H ΕΚΚΛΗΣΙΑ ΤΗΣ ΕΛΛΑΔΟΣ). 
  23/07/. Ορθόδοξος Συναξαριστής.

 Russian Sources
  5 августа (23 июля). Православная Энциклопедия под редакцией Патриарха Московского и всея Руси Кирилла (электронная версия). (Orthodox Encyclopedia - Pravenc.ru).
  23 июля по старому стилю / 5 августа по новому стилю. СПЖ "Союз православных журналистов". .
  23 июля (ст.ст.) 5 августа  (нов. ст.). Русская Православная Церковь Отдел внешних церковных связей. (DECR).

July in the Eastern Orthodox calendar